John Clare Billing ARCO (1866–1955) was an organist, composer and writer based in England.

Life

He was born in 1866 in Stamford, Lincolnshire, and educated at Stamford School.

He studied organ with Haydn Keeton at Peterborough Cathedral and also James Edward Adkins.

Appointments

Organist of St Peter's Church, Southampton 1887 - 1890
Organist of St John's College, Lancashire 1890 - 1898
Organist of St Mary's Church, Stamford 1898 - 1905
Organist of St Mary's Church, Ketton 1905 - 1907
Organist of St Mary's Church, Stamford 1907 - 1918
Organist of St Martin's Church, Stamford 1918 - ????

Compositions

He composed
Slumber Song for Violin & Pianoforte 
Vestry Prayers 
Your dear Face (song) 
Round About Stamford

References

1866 births
1955 deaths
English organists
British male organists
English composers
People from Stamford, Lincolnshire
People educated at Stamford School